Sture Lagerwall (13 December 1908 – 1 November 1964) was a Swedish actor and film director. He appeared in more than 70 films between 1931 and 1963. He was born in Stockholm, and died in Limhamn, Sweden, in 1964.

Selected filmography

 Say It with Music (1929)
 The False Millionaire (1931)
 The Red Day (1931)
 Mother-in-Law's Coming (1932)
 Pojkarna på Storholmen (1932)
 Marriageable Daughters (1933)
 Fired (1934)
 The Women Around Larsson (1934)
 The People of Småland (1935)
 Walpurgis Night (1935)
 Adventure (1936)
 Witches' Night (1937)
 Comrades in Uniform (1938)
 Career (1938)
 Life Begins Today (1939)
 Emilie Högquist (1939)
 The Two of Us (1939)
 Blossom Time (1940)
 Her Melody (1940)
 The Three of Us (1940)
 Lasse-Maja (1941)
 Adventurer (1942)
 Kungsgatan (1943)
 Sonja (1943)
 En dag skall gry (1944)
 The Emperor of Portugallia (1944)
 The Journey Away (1945)
 His Majesty Must Wait (1945)
 Johansson and Vestman (1946)
 Onsdagsväninnan (1946) - acted and directed)
 Love Goes Up and Down (1946)
 How to Love (1947)
 I Love You Karlsson (1947)
 The Night Watchman's Wife (1947)
 Banketten (1948)
 Loffe as a Millionaire (1948)
Sin (1948)
 The Saucepan Journey (1950)
 The White Cat (1951)
 The Nuthouse (1951)
 Kvinnan bakom allt (1951)
 Hidden in the Fog (1953)
 The Unicorn (1955)
 The Halo Is Slipping (1957)
 The Venetian (1958)
 Summer and Sinners (1960)
 The Devil's Eye (1960)

References

External links

1908 births
1964 deaths
Swedish male film actors
Swedish film directors
Male actors from Stockholm
20th-century Swedish male actors